South Horizons East is one of the 17 constituencies in the Southern District, Hong Kong.

The constituency returns one district councillor to the Southern District Council, with an election every four years. Since its creation in the 1999 election, the seat was last held by Civic Party James Yu Chun-hei.

South Horizons East constituency is loosely based on the eastern part of the South Horizons in Ap Lei Chau with estimated population of 15,319.

Councillors represented

Election results

2010s

2000s

1990s

Notes

References

Ap Lei Chau
Constituencies of Hong Kong
Constituencies of Southern District Council
1999 establishments in Hong Kong
Constituencies established in 1999